William Brookes (14 October 1825 -16 July 1898) was a member of both the Queensland Legislative Council and the Queensland Legislative Assembly in Australia.

Early life
Brookes was born in Hanging Ditch, Manchester, to William Brookes and his wife, Mary (née Oakden) and was educated at Hall State School, Manchester, and was also privately schooled. He began his working career as an apprentice draper before arriving in Sydney in 1848 on the SS 'Bengal'. After trying his hand unsuccessfully as a gold miner at Turon, he returned to Sydney and joined the Union Bank of Australia as a clerk.

In 1853, Brookes was sent to Queensland to work with J.S. Turner in opening a branch of the Union Bank and five years later, in partnership with his brother Benjamin, purchased an Ironmonger's business in Brisbane.

Political career
Brookes entered politics in 1858, serving as an alderman in the Brisbane Municipal Council till 1866. He was elected to the Queensland Legislative Assembly as the member for East Moreton in September 1863 but nine days later his election was declared null and void and in the resulting by-election he lost to Robert Cribb.

In 1864, Brookes stood for the seat of Town of Brisbane which he duly won however, once again his election was declared null and void. This time though, he won the by-election and held the seat till 1867 when he was defeated by Dr Kevin O'Doherty.

His final representation in the Assembly came when he won the seat of North Brisbane in 1882, holding it for six years until losing the seat in 1888.

Brookes was appointed to the Queensland Legislative Council in 1891, serving for six years until his retirement from politics in 1897.

Opposition to the Melanesian labour trade 
As a liberal humanitarian he was an ardent opponent of the Melanesian labour trade. He stressed its worst features; that the labourers were treated like chattels, and that they were often obtained illegally or unwittingly. In the Select Committee on the General Question of Polynesian Labour 1876, Brookes stated "The idea of obtaining servants over whom we could have unlimited control; who would be obedient, docile, handy, industrious... for wages that are so small they seemed to be next to no wages at all... drove out all consideration of how these people were procured" and "so it came to pass that citizens,... saw no shame in availing themselves of the labor of poor helpless savages who have been inveigled from their native homes, or... who had been sold at their island by their chiefs, and bought by white men and bought a second time at our wharves in Brisbane, Maryborough, Rockhampton and Mackay" "They had a market price; were quoted at so much a head...They were, in fact, merchandise."

Personal life
In Sydney in 1849, Brookes married Mary Ann Evans, whom he had met on the voyage to Australia and together they had five children. Brookes died in 1898 and was buried in South Brisbane Cemetery.

References

Members of the Queensland Legislative Assembly
Members of the Queensland Legislative Council
1825 births
1898 deaths
Burials in South Brisbane Cemetery
19th-century Australian politicians
English emigrants to colonial Australia